Sergeant Henry H. Taylor (July 4, 1841 – May 3, 1909) was an American soldier who fought in the American Civil War. Clark received his country's highest award for bravery during combat, the Medal of Honor, for his action during the Battle of Vicksburg in Mississippi on June 25, 1863. He was honored with the award on 1 September 1893.

Biography
Taylor was born in Galena, Illinois on July 4, 1841. He enlisted into the 45th Illinois Infantry C Company, entering service in Galena, Jo Daviess County, Illinois. He died on May 3, 1909 and he is buried in Clay Center, Kansas.

Medal of Honor citation

See also

List of American Civil War Medal of Honor recipients: T–Z

References

1841 births
1909 deaths
People of Illinois in the American Civil War
Union Army officers
United States Army Medal of Honor recipients
American Civil War recipients of the Medal of Honor